Out There is a compilation album by the American rock band Love, released in 1988 on Big Beat Records (ACE records).  It consists of tracks from the 1969 double LP Out Here and the 1970 LP False Start.

Track listing
All songs were written by Arthur Lee, unless noted.

 "I'll Pray for You"  – 4:17
 "Love Is Coming"  – 1:25
 "Signed D.C."  – 5:17
 "I Still Wonder" (Jay Donnellan, Arthur Lee)  – 3:08
 "Listen to My Song"  – 2:23
 "Doggone" - 12:05
 "Nice to Be"  – 1:54
 "Stand Out" - 3:02
 "The Everlasting First" (featuring Jimi Hendrix)  – 3:02
 "Gimi a Little Break" — 2:02
 "Willow Willow"  – 3:22
 "You Are Something"  – 2:04
 "Love Is More Than Words or Better Late Than Never" 11:20
 "Gather 'Round"  – 4:51

All songs but 2, 9, and 10 are from Out Here. 2, 9, 10 are from False Start.

Personnel
 Arthur Lee - rhythm guitar, piano, organ, vocal
 Jay Donnellan - lead guitar (tracks 1, 3-8, 11-12)
 Frank Fayad - bass
 George Suranovich - drums
 Jim Hobson - organ, piano (tracks 1)
 Gary Rowles - lead guitar (tracks 2, 9, 10 & 13)
 Drachen Theaker - drums (track 3)
 Nooney Rickett - rhythm guitar, backing vocal (tracks 2, 9-10)
 Jimi Hendrix - lead guitar (track 9)
 George Gaal, Arthur Lee - engineers
 Burt Shonberg - album cover artwork

References

Love (band) albums
Blue Thumb Records albums
1971 compilation albums
Ace Records (United Kingdom) compilation albums
Albums produced by Arthur Lee (musician)